Kathryn Wilder is a stage and film actress known for her roles in the films Two Heads Creek and All is True.

Select filmography

Film
 All Is True (2018, as Judith Shakespeare)
 Two Heads Creek (2019, as Anna)

Television
 Frontier (2017-2018, 11 episodes, as Chaulk)
Call the Midwife (2021, 1 episode, as Audrey Fleming)

Stage
 Romeo and Juliet (2016, as Peta)
 Hamlet (2017, as Ophelia)

References

External links
 

English stage actresses
English film actresses
Year of birth missing (living people)
Living people
21st-century English actresses